James Melia (2 April 1874 - February 1905) was a professional football player who played for Sheffield Wednesday, Tottenham Hotspur and Preston North End.

Career
Malia started his career with Sheffield Wednesday and spent two seasons at the club before moving to Tottenham Hotspur where he spent three seasons. After Spurs he had a spell with Preston North End. Then in February 1905 he fell ill and died at the age of 30.

References

1874 births
1905 deaths
Sheffield Wednesday F.C. players
Tottenham Hotspur F.C. players
Preston North End F.C. players
English footballers